Joy Worth (1910 – August 1987) was a British singer, radio presenter, and announcer, who was active during the 1940s and 1950s. Before a career on radio, she was a member of The Cavendish Three, a close harmony trio, from 1934 to 1939. Worth joined the BBC as an announcer in July 1942.

She appeared as a castaway on the BBC Radio programme Desert Island Discs on 17 Oct 1952. Worth died in August 1987 at the age of 77.

References

External links 
 1943 photo of Worth and a colleague

1910 births
1987 deaths
BBC radio presenters